The Beit She'an Valley ( or ) is a valley in Israel.

The valley lies within the Beit She'an rift, part of the Afro-Syrian Rift (Jordan Rift Valley), which opens westwards to the Harod Valley. It is a middle part of the Jordan Valley. The valley is bounded by the Mount Gilboa mountain range from the southwest, Jordan River from the east, Nahal Tavor from the north, the lower part of the Malcha Stream (Nahal Malcha), where it flows into the Jordan River, from the south. It is named after the ancient city of   Beit She'an.

The valley is abundant in springs. For this reason, in order to attract tourism, the  Beit She'an Valley Regional Council was rebranded as the Emek HaMaayanot Regional Council ("Valley of Springs Regional Council")

It includes the Beit She'an National park in the northern part of Beit She'an.

See also
Geography of Israel

References

External links
Take it slow in Israel’s Valley of Springs

Valleys of Israel
Valley of Springs Regional Council